Dotted line, Dotted Line or The Dotted Line may refer to:


Animals
Dottedline snake eel
Dotted-line blenny
Dotted border (Agriopis marginaria), a moth in the family Geometridae

Music
A Dotted Line, a 2014 album by Nickel Creek

Songs
"Dotted Line", a song by The O'Jays
"Dotted Line", a song by Spunge from The Story So Far (Spunge album)
"Dotted Line", a song by Liz Phair for the People Like Us soundtrack, Liz Phair discography
"The Dotted Line", a single by Skip Ewing
"Dotted Line/Juju Man", a song by Labrinth from Imagination & the Misfit Kid

Other uses
Line (graphics), in dotted format
a leader (typography)
dotted line reporting, an alternative to solid line reporting between managers and supervisees
 Dotted Line (horse), American Thoroughbred racemare; see Man o' War Stakes